DreamWorks Dragons is an American television series airing on Cartoon Network (for the first two seasons) and Netflix (after the second season) based on the 2010 film How to Train Your Dragon. The series serves as a bridge between the first film and its 2014 sequel. A one-hour preview consisting of two episodes aired on August 7, 2012, with the official premiere of the series on September 4, 2012. 118 episodes of DreamWorks Dragons have been released, concluding the series.

The series was announced by Cartoon Network on October 12, 2010. According to Tim Johnson, executive producer for How to Train Your Dragon, the series was planned to be much darker and deeper than DreamWorks Animation's previous television series spin-offs, with a similar tone to the movie. DreamWorks Dragons was the first DreamWorks Animation series to air on Cartoon Network rather than Nickelodeon.

DreamWorks Dragons features the voice talents of Jay Baruchel, America Ferrera, Christopher Mintz-Plasse, Julie Marcus, Andrée Vermeulen, T. J. Miller, Zack Pearlman, Chris Edgerly and Nolan North. The sixth and final season of DreamWorks Dragons: Race to the Edge was released on February 16, 2018.

Series overview

Cartoon Network episodes
The first two seasons of the series aired on Cartoon Network.

Season 1: Riders of Berk (2012–13)
The first season is subtitled Riders of Berk. The series begins where the first movie leaves off, featuring 15–16 year old characters.

Season 2: Defenders of Berk (2013–14)
The second and final season is subtitled Defenders of Berk.

Netflix episodes: Race to the Edge
The series is subtitled Race to the Edge on Netflix. The series comes after the short film Dawn of the Dragon Racers (as the pilot episode) and the beginning is set about three years after the second season and the end a few Months (most likely 1 or 2) before the events of How to Train Your Dragon 2, featuring 18–19-year-old characters. Netflix reset the season count after the series moved from Cartoon Network, so the first season on Netflix is actually the third season released for DreamWorks Dragons, through to its eighth and final released season (labelled the sixth season on Netflix).

Season 1 (2015)

Season 2 (2016)

Season 3 (2016)

Season 4 (2017)

Season 5 (2017)

Season 6 (2018)

References

External links
 
 
 

Dragons: Riders of Berk